Hamelin Station or Hamelin Station Reserve is a tourist site and conservation reserve, that was a pastoral lease, occupying an area of 202,000 hectares (499,153 acres) near the Shark Bay World Heritage Area in Western Australia. It was formerly a sheep station running merino sheep. It is famous for its free flowing artesian bore from the Birdrong Formation in the Carnarvon Artesian Basin, near the homestead, which has created an artificial lake that has become a haven for bird life.

The homestead is 3 kilometres from the nearby historic Hamelin Pool Telegraph Station and Post Office. The lease has approximately 32 kilometres of shoreline on the hypersaline Hamelin Pool Embayment, which feature some of the best living stromatolite formations in the world.

Early years
In 1884 the section of telegraph line to Roebourne that passed through the property had been completed.

Parts of the station were taken up in the early 1900s. At that time J. T. Martin, of Roebourne, had unimproved leases in the Hamelin Pool area consisting of 135,000 acres and Messrs Connor, Doherty, and Durack had 94,000 acres adjoining Martin's leases. Both of these lease holdings were sold to the Flintcliff Pastoral Company in July 1907.
The Flintcliff Pastoral Company (Frank Cadd), who variously named the leases as Boolagoora or Flint Cliff Station, sold the combined leases to Messrs. Ayliffe and Musk a short time before March 1919.

It was reported in March 1919 that the station had been sold to the Hamelin Pastoral Company. At that time the combined lease comprised some 500,000 acres and has not been expanded since.  It became known as Hamelin Station. At the time it was reported to be carrying 10,000 sheep, some horses and a number of camels.

In the early years, the lack of readily available water for stock limited the growth of the station, however the entire station sits on an extensive artesian basin of semi saline water.

The lack of readily available surface or shallow ground water necessitated the drilling of deep artesian and sub artesian bores.

In 1928 the station was under the management of a Mr Taylor, who had embarked on a program of drilling for water. At this time the first bore at the homestead was estimated to have a daily flow of 3,000,000 gallons per day and had created the artificial lake, which he had declared a sanctuary because of the abundant bird life.

A further eight bores had also been drilled with the last one recently completed yielding water at a depth of 140 feet. The abundance of water and the prospect for more lead to rapid expansion in sheep numbers on the station.

The homestead is constructed from compacted coquina shell blocks mined from the nearby coast.

In the following years sheep numbers varied widely between 10,000 and 26,400;   in 1977 it was sold with a guaranteed 18,000 sheep, although this number was subsequently disputed.

Events

The station was purchased from the Hamelin Pastoral Company by grazier Richard (Dick) Vincent in 1970, and subsequently sold to pastoralist Les Schubert in 1974 and managed by his son Philip for a number of years before being sold to the politician Ross Lightfoot.

For many years feral goats were abundant on the property thriving on the low scrubland of the area. The Schubert family in 1976 mustered and shipped over 4,000 goats to the Middle East from the property.

De-stocking and conservation 

The Wake family subsequently purchased it in September 1978 before selling it to Bush Heritage Australia in March 2015. It is now known as Hamelin Station Reserve.

Since that time all stock have been removed from the station and the artificial watering points shut down.

The shearers' quarters have been renovated and now serve as a tourist and camping facility for visitors to the area.

References

External links

Pastoral leases in Western Australia
Homesteads in Western Australia
Shark Bay